Leanne Ashley Wong (born September 20, 2003) is an American artistic gymnast.  She was a member of the gold medal winning teams at the 2022 World Championships and the 2019 Pan American Games.  She is the 2021 World all-around silver medalist, floor exercise bronze medalist, and was an alternate for the 2020 Olympic team.

Personal life
Wong has two younger brothers called Michael and Brendan. Her parents, Marco Wong and Bee Ding, are both research scientists. She enjoys sightseeing, cooking and playing piano in her free time. Before Wong started gymnastics, she took ice skating classes.

Career

Junior

2017 
Wong qualified as an elite gymnast at the Parkettes National Qualifier in May alongside club teammate Kara Eaker, where she scored a 51.900 in the all-around to qualify to nationals. She later competed at the American Classic in Texas, winning gold medals in the all-around and on vault. At the end of July, Wong competed at the Secret U.S. Classic, where she placed ninth in the all-around and sixth on vault.

Wong competed at her first national championships in August. Wong continued to impress on vault with a two-night score of 29.45, winning the national title on the apparatus ahead of Maile O'Keefe and Emma Malabuyo. Wong also placed third on floor exercise as well as fifth in the all-around behind O'Keefe, Malabuyo, Eaker, and Adeline Kenlin with a combined total of 108.250 points. After the championships, she was named to the junior national team.

2018 
With O'Keefe, Malabuyo, Eaker, and Kenlin all moving to the senior level, Wong entered the season as one of the top American junior competitors. On April 8, Wong was named to the Junior Pan American Championships team. In advance of this competition, she competed at the Auburn National Qualifier, where she won the all-around with upgraded routines on the uneven bars, balance beam, and floor exercise.

Wong traveled to Buenos Aires, Argentina in June to make her international debut at the Junior Pan American Championships. Competing on a team alongside Jordan Bowers, Tori Tatum, and JaFree Scott, Wong won a gold medal in the team competition. Individually, she won the bronze medal in the all-around behind Bowers and Zoe Allaire-Bourgie of Canada. Two days later, Wong competed in the event finals on vault, uneven bars, and balance beam, placing second on each apparatus behind Tatum, Bowers, and Allaire-Bourgie, respectively.

Wong competed at the GK U.S. Classic at the end of July. She won the all-around by over a point ahead of American Classic champion Kayla DiCello and Junior Pan American champion Bowers with a score of 55.350. She also placed first on vault and floor exercise and third on balance beam. Three weeks later, Wong competed at the 2018 National Championships. With her victory at the Classic, she entered the meet as one of the contenders for the title along with fellow national team members Bowers, DiCello, Tatum, and Sunisa Lee. After two days of competition in which Wong hit all eight of her competitive routines, she became the 2018 Junior all-around champion ahead of DiCello and Lee. Her two-day combined total of 112.250 would have placed her 4th in the senior division. Additionally, she won the national title on floor exercise, was the runner-up on vault behind DiCello and on uneven bars behind Lee, and placed sixth on balance beam. Her performance secured her spot on the junior national team for the second consecutive year.

Senior

2019 
In January, it was announced that Wong would make her senior debut and represent the USA at the American Cup alongside second year senior Grace McCallum in March. On March 2, Wong won the American Cup title with a score of 56.765, beating McCallum in second and the two previous World all-around silver medalists, Canada's Ellie Black (2017) and Japan's Mai Murakami (2018), who tied for third place. She debuted numerous upgrades, most notably a piked double Arabian (Dos Santos I) to immediate stag jump as her first tumbling pass on floor exercise. She posted the highest scores of the competition on vault and balance beam.

In June, after the conclusion of the American Classic, Wong was named as one of the eight athletes being considered for the team to compete at the 2019 Pan American Games along with Sloane Blakely, Kara Eaker, Aleah Finnegan, Morgan Hurd, Shilese Jones, Sunisa Lee, and Riley McCusker.

At the 2019 GK US Classic Leanne Wong finished fifth in the all-around behind Simone Biles, Riley McCusker,Grace McCallum, and Kara Eaker. She also finished tied for eighth on bars with Jordan Chiles, fourth on beam behind Eaker, McCusker, and Biles, and tied for fifth on floor with McCusker.  After the competition she was named to the team to compete at the Pan American Games alongside Finnegan, Hurd, McCusker, and Eaker.

At the Pan American Games Wong only competed on uneven bars and balance beam. She contributed scores on both events to the team's gold medal winning performance. She qualified to the uneven bars final in second behind McCusker and would've qualified to the balance beam final in third if not for teammates Eaker and McCusker posting higher scores than her as a maximum of two gymnasts per country may participate in each individual final. During the uneven bars final Wong won the silver medal, once again finishing behind McCusker.

At the 2019 U.S. National Championships, Wong competed all four events on the first day of competition but ended the night in fifth place after she received a low score on floor exercise. Her attempted second skill, a laid-out 3.5 twist, was downgraded to a laid-out triple twisting due to under-rotation, thus invalidating the intended triple twist she then performed for her final skill. On the second day of competition, she performed cleanly and placed fifth in the all-around behind Simone Biles, Sunisa Lee, Grace McCallum, and Morgan Hurd.  Additionally she won bronze on the balance beam behind Biles and club mate Kara Eaker. As a result she was added to the national team.

In September Wong competed at the World team selection camp and placed eighth with a score of 54.750 after falling on her vault. She posted the second best score on bars behind Sunisa Lee. Following the two-day camp she was named as a non-traveling alternate for the team along with Morgan Hurd.

2020 
In March Wong was selected to compete at the City of Jesolo Trophy alongside Kara Eaker, Shilese Jones, and Sophia Butler.  However, the USA decided to not send a team due to the coronavirus outbreak in Italy.

In November Wong signed her National Letter of Intent with the Florida Gators, starting in the 2021–22 school year.

2021 
In April, Wong competed at the American Classic and placed second in the all-around behind Skye Blakely. She won the vault title, scoring 14.400 on her double-twisting  yurchenko. She placed eleventh on beam after grabbing the beam on a turn and tied for sixth on the floor after going out of bounds and falling.  In May, Wong competed at the U.S. Classic where she finished sixth in the all-around, fifth on floor exercise, and second on balance beam behind Simone Biles.  At the National Championships Wong finished fifth in the all-around.  Additionally she won bronze on floor exercise behind Biles and Kayla DiCello.  As a result she was named to the national team and selected to compete at the Olympic Trials.  At the Olympic Trials, Wong finished eighth in the all-around and second on floor exercise.  She was named as an alternate for the Olympic team.

In October Wong was selected to compete at the 2021 World Championships alongside Kayla DiCello, Konnor McClain, and eMjae Frazier.  While there she qualified for the all-around final in second place behind Angelina Melnikova, the floor exercise final in third place behind Mai Murakami and Melnikova, and the balance beam final in fourth place. In the all around final, she clinched silver behind Angelina Melnikova and in front of teammate Kayla Dicello. In event finals, she placed fourth on balance beam after grabbing the beam on her acrobatic series, and won the bronze medal on floor exercise.

NCAA

2021–2022 season 
Wong made her NCAA debut on January 7 in a quad meet against Rutgers, Northern Illinois, and Texas Women's.  She competed on uneven bars, balance beam, and floor exercise to help Florida win the meet.  Her uneven bars score of 9.875 was the highest of the night alongside teammate Savannah Schoenherr.  Wong made her collegiate all-around appearance against Alabama on January 16, scoring a 39.300 to take second. On January 28, in a meet against Arkansas, Wong earned her first career perfect ten on the uneven bars.  Additionally she earned her first collegiate all-around title.  Wong earned her second collegiate all-around title in the meet against LSU on February 11. On March 11, in a quad meet at North Carolina State University, Wong upped her career best all-around score to a 39.850, which at that time was the highest all-around score in the nation achieved that season. In her first SEC Championships, Wong won the balance beam title with a career-best 9.975 and tied for second in the all-around, helping the Gators to win their first SEC Championship title since 2016. For her performance, Wong earned All-SEC and All-Freshman team honors. In the regional final on April 2, Wong upped her career-best all-around score to a 39.875 and earned her first perfect ten on vault. In the national semifinals, Wong contributed scores of 9.9000 on vault, 9.9125 on uneven bars, 9.8625 on balance beam, and 9.9500 on floor exercise to place fifth in the all-around and help the Gators qualify into the national final. For her performance, she earned first team All-America honors on vault, floor exercise, and in the all-around, as well as second team All-America honors on uneven bars. In the national final, Wong contributed scores of 9.9125 on vault, 9.8750 on uneven bars, 9.8375 on balance beam, and 9.9500 on floor exercise to contribute to the Gators' second-place finish.

2022–2023 season 
Wong made her season debut on January 6 in a quad meet against Ball State, Lindenwood, and West Virginia, where she competed on vault, uneven bars, and balance beam, and shared the bars title with a 9.950, tying teammate Trinity Thomas. Wong made her season debut in the all-around on January 13 against Auburn, where she scored her second career 10.0 on the uneven bars, her first career 10.0 on the balance beam, and a 39.825 in the all-around, the nation's high score. This marked the second year in a row where Wong had the nation's first uneven bars 10.0. In a dual meet against Georgia on January 27, Wong again won the bars, beam, and all-around titles, scoring a 9.975, 9.925, and 39.650, respectively. In a dual meet against Arkansas on February 3, Wong scored her third career 10.0 on the uneven bars, her second career 10.0 on the balance beam, and a 39.775 in the all-around. In a dual meet against Missouri on February 10, Wong re-set her career high on floor with a 9.975, sharing the event title with teammates Sloane Blakely and Thomas. In a dual meet against Kentucky, Wong scored a 9.975 on the uneven bars and shared the event title with teammates Kayla DiCello and Thomas as part of a Florida record 49.800 total on bars. In a dual meet against Oklahoma on March 3, Wong shared the floor exercise title with Faith Torrez of the Sooners with a 9.950 and won the all-around with a 39.675. In a quad meet held at Texas Women's University on March 12, Wong won the bars title and all-around title with a 9.950 and 39.650, respectively.

Career perfect 10.0

Return to elite

2022 
In July 2022, Wong returned to elite competition at the 2022 U.S. Classic. She competed in the all-around and scored a 54.400, winning the title. She also placed first balance beam and third on the floor exercise. On the uneven bars, the fell on her Bhardwaj and placed eighth.  In August Wong competed at the National Championships.  She only competed on the uneven bars and balance beam.  She co-won the national title on the uneven bars alongside Shilese Jones and finished fifth on balance beam.

In October Wong was selected to compete at the 2022 World Championships alongside Skye Blakely, Jade Carey, Jordan Chiles, and Shilese Jones.  During the qualification round Wong only competed on vault and helped the USA qualify first as a team.  During the team final Wong competed on the uneven bars, helping the USA win their sixth consecutive team gold medal.

Selected Competitive Skills

Competitive history

References 

2003 births
Living people
American female artistic gymnasts
Sportspeople from Overland Park, Kansas
U.S. women's national team gymnasts
Gymnasts at the 2019 Pan American Games
Pan American Games medalists in gymnastics
Pan American Games gold medalists for the United States
Pan American Games silver medalists for the United States
Medalists at the 2019 Pan American Games
Medalists at the World Artistic Gymnastics Championships
Florida Gators women's gymnasts
NCAA gymnasts who have scored a perfect 10